Faraj Jumaa (Arabic:فرج جمعة) (born 6 September 1993) is an Emirati footballer.

References

External links
 

Emirati footballers
1993 births
Living people
Emirates Club players
Al-Shaab CSC players
Al Ain FC players
Al Dhaid SC players
Al-Arabi SC (UAE) players
Place of birth missing (living people)
UAE First Division League players
UAE Pro League players
Association football wingers